A New Era of Corruption is the third studio album by American deathcore band Whitechapel. It was released worldwide on June 8, 2010, through Metal Blade Records. In the USA, just under 10,700 copies were sold in the first week, placing it at No. 43 on the Billboard 200 chart. This is the last Whitechapel album to feature drummer Kevin Lane.

History and background 
The recording session for A New Era of Corruption ran from December 27, 2009, to January 2010 with Jason Suecof being the chosen producer. It was announced that the album's recording was completely finished on March 31, 2010. Guitarist Alex Wade said, "I think this record truly represents where we are as musicians at this point in our career. A New Era of Corruption is the heaviest and most aggressive material we have written to date." In the same interview, Wade confirmed the release of the album would be on June 8, 2010.

The name of the album is derived from a passage of the lyrics in their song "Possession" which appeared on their previous album, This Is Exile. The album makes A New Era of Corruption the first Whitechapel album that does not have a title track. Chino Moreno of Deftones and Vincent Bennett of The Acacia Strain make guest appearances on the album, Moreno in the song "Reprogrammed to Hate" and Bennett in "Murder Sermon".

Lyrical themes 

The concepts and lyrical themes of A New Era of Corruption travel into new boundaries and details where previous Whitechapel albums did not. With The Somatic Defilement being a narrative of Jack the Ripper and This Is Exile containing political and anti-religious themes, A New Era of Corruption is the first Whitechapel release that is not a concept album. It generally focuses on negative themes, for example "Devolver" is written within the concept of the devolution in society and how it has crafted "violent and hateful" individuals, while "Breeding Violence" was written about the increasing corruption in society during the post-9/11 times, and "Animus" is about the death of vocalist Phillip Bozeman's mother.

Track listing

Credits 
Production and performance credits are adapted from the album liner notes.

Personnel 
Whitechapel
 Phil Bozeman – vocals
 Ben Savage – lead guitar
 Alex Wade – guitar
 Zach Householder – guitar
 Gabe Crisp – bass
 Kevin Lane – drums

Guest musicians
 Vincent Bennett (The Acacia Strain) – vocals on "Murder Sermon"
 Chino Moreno (Deftones) – vocals on "Reprogrammed to Hate"
 Cole Martinez – additional sound design, sampling
 Jason Suecof – guitar solos on "A Future Corrupt" and "Necromechanical"

Production
 Mark Lewis – recording (drums)
 Whitechapel – production
 Jason Suecof – production, mixing, engineering
 Alan Douches – mastering
 Shaun Lopez – recording (Chino Moreno vocals)

Artwork and design
 Brent Elliott White – artwork
 Whitechapel – art direction

Studios 
 Audiohammer, Orlando, FL, US – recording, mixing
 West West Side Music – mastering
 The Airport Studios, Burbank, CA, US – recording (Chino Moreno vocals)
 Conquistador Recording Studios – additional Sound design, sampling

Charts

References

External links 
 
 A New Era of Corruption at Metal Blade
 A New Era of Corruption at Whitechapel's official website

2010 albums
Whitechapel (band) albums
Metal Blade Records albums
Albums produced by Jason Suecof